Sinocyclocheilus macrolepis is a species of ray-finned fish in the genus Sinocyclocheilus.

References 

macrolepis
Fish described in 1989